François Choquette  (born January 3, 1974) is a Canadian politician, who was elected to the House of Commons of Canada in the 2011 election and re-elected in 2015 before being defeated in 2019. He represented the electoral district of Drummond as a member of the New Democratic Party.

Prior to being elected, Choquette was a teacher. Choquette has a bachelor's degree in secondary education in French and history and a master's degree in literature.

Choquette also ran unsuccessfully in the 2006 federal election in Drummond.

After the 2015 election, Choquette was appointed the NDP critic for Official Languages in the 42nd Canadian Parliament. Choquette sponsored a private member's bill (Bill C-203) that would require Supreme Court judges be fluently bilingual in English and French. However, it was defeated with both Liberals and Conservatives voting against the bill.

Electoral record

References

External links

1974 births
Canadian educators
French Quebecers
Living people
Members of the House of Commons of Canada from Quebec
New Democratic Party MPs
People from Granby, Quebec
21st-century Canadian politicians